Paul Scott Teller (born February 21, 1971) is the Executive Director of Advancing American Freedom, Mike Pence's advocacy organization. He served in the Trump White House as Special Assistant to the President for Legislative Affairs, and then Director of Strategic Affairs for Vice President Mike Pence. Teller was also the former Chief of Staff for Senator Ted Cruz and former Executive Director of the United States House of Representatives Republican Study Committee. 

In a profile published shortly following Teller's appointment to be Sen. Cruz's Chief of Staff, The Hill described Teller as "Cruz's agitator in chief." In late January 2017, then-President Donald Trump and Vice-President Pence hired Paul Teller as Special Assistant to the President for Legislative Affairs, with a focus on Senate and House conservatives. 

 In February 2020, the Washington Examiner reported that Teller was appointed by Vice President Pence as Deputy Assistant to the President and Director of Strategic Initiatives for the Vice President, leaving his previous position in the White House Office of Legislative Affairs.

Early life
Raised on Long Island, Teller graduated from Duke University in 1993 with a Bachelor of Arts in Political Science and earned a Doctorate in Philosophy in the subject  American University in 1999.

Capitol Hill career
After receiving his doctorate, Teller became a professional staff member for the Committee on House Administration under Rep. Bill Thomas. In 2001, he became legislative director for the Republican Study Committee, later rising to deputy director and executive director.

In 2014, Teller joined the Board of Advisors of the National Federation of Republican Assemblies.  He is a member of the Council for National Policy.

2011 U.S. debt crisis controversy
Teller was involved in controversy during the 2011 U.S. debt ceiling crisis when, in July 2011, he and his subordinates reportedly emailed several conservative groups to urge the groups to lobby against a plan put forward by Speaker of the House John Boehner.  After the emails were discussed at a Republican conference meeting on July 27, 2011, which Teller attended, members of the conference chanted "fire him, fire him". Anonymous Republican staff members criticized Teller for what they described as his "aggressive language and willingness to attack Republicans," while another anonymous senior GOP aide argued that "coordinating on message and revving up conservative activists is not, in and of itself, a bad thing." While it was reported that members chanted "fire him, fire him" to Paul Teller during the closed door meeting, reports later came out showing the situation was embellished and exaggerated by the media, while others claimed it never happened at all.

2013 firing
On December 11, 2013, it was reported that Teller had been fired by RSC Chairman Steve Scalise, angering some conservative leaders.

Chief of Staff for Ted Cruz
In early 2014, Senator Ted Cruz hired Paul Teller as his new deputy chief of staff. On September 10, 2014, Senator Cruz announced that Teller would take over the role of Chief of Staff following former Chief of Staff Chip Roy's transition from the Senator's federal office to take on the role of senior advisor for the Senator's political operations.

Trump administration role
In late January 2017, President Donald Trump and Vice-President Mike Pence hired Paul Teller as Special Assistant to the President for Legislative Affairs, with a focus on Senate and House conservatives.

New Role in the Trump Administration for Vice President Mike Pence
In February 2020, the Washington Examiner reported Paul Teller would leave his post in the White House Office of Legislative Affairs to assume a new role in the Trump administration for Vice President Mike Pence. Vice President Pence appointed Teller for the role of handling and maintaining key relationships with conservative groups and lawmakers. With his new role in the Trump administration, Teller's official title in the White House was  "Deputy Assistant to the President and Director of Strategic Initiatives for the Vice President"

Advancing American Freedom
On April 7, 2021, former Vice President Mike Pence launched Advancing American Freedom, a policy and advocacy organization. Teller was announced as the Executive Director of Advancing American Freedom, a position he currently holds. As Executive Director of AAF, Teller works with the former Vice President to develop and build new policies, strategies, and coalitions to promote conservatism in the United States.

References

External links
 

,
1971 births
American University School of Public Affairs alumni
Duke University alumni
Living people
Trump administration personnel
United States congressional aides